The 1995 Delray Beach Winter Championships was a women's tennis tournament played on outdoor hard courts at the Delray Beach Tennis Center in Delray Beach, Florida in the United States that was part of Tier II of the 1995 WTA Tour. It was the 17th edition of the tournament and was held from March 6 through March 12, 1995. First-seeded Steffi Graf won the singles title.

Finals

Singles

 Steffi Graf defeated  Conchita Martínez 6–2, 6–4
 It was Graf's 2nd singles title of the year and the 88th of her career.

Doubles

 Mary Joe Fernández /  Jana Novotná defeated  Lori McNeil /  Larisa Savchenko 6–4, 6–0
 It was Fernández's 2nd title of the year and the 15th of her career. It was Novotná's 4th title of the year and the 67th of her career.

References

External links
 ITF tournament edition details
 Tournament draws

Delray Beach Winter Championships
Virginia Slims of Florida
Delray Beach Winter Championships
Delray Beach Winter Championships
Delray Beach Winter Championships